Lopez vs Lopez  is an American sitcom television series created by George Lopez, Mayan Lopez and Debby Wolfe that premiered on NBC on November 4, 2022. Wolfe also serves as showrunner and is executive producer. It stars Lopez and his daughter Mayan as fictionalized versions of themselves along with Matt Shively, Brice Gonzalez, Al Madrigal, and Selenis Leyva in supporting roles.

Premise
George Lopez, the owner of a moving company that went bankrupt is forced to move into his daughter Mayan’s house. The problem is that Mayan and George have just started speaking after being estranged for most of her teenage years. Now they seek to heal their relationship and learn more about each other. Meanwhile, Quinten, Mayan’s boyfriend, and Mayan and Quinten’s son, Chance are adjusting to George living with them, and Rosie, Mayan’s mom and George’s ex-wife also drops by, usually to either see Mayan or throw shade.

Cast and characters

Main

 George Lopez as himself
 Mayan Lopez as herself, George's daughter
 Matt Shively as Quinten Van Bryan, Mayan's boyfriend
 Brice Gonzalez as Chance Lopez-Van Bryan, George's grandson and Mayan's and Quinten's son
 Selenis Leyva as Rosie, George's ex-wife
 Al Madrigal as Oscar

Recurring
 Laci Mosley as Brookie
 Aparna Nancherla as Dr. Pocha
 Liz Torres as Daisy
 Stephen Tobolowsky as Sam Van Bryan
   Momo Rodriguez as Momo

Guest Stars
 Caroline Rhea as Jana
   Moises Chavez   as Raul
   Jerry  Garcia   as Mando
    Adam Kulbersh  as Jerry
  Maria Canals  as Lily
    Ana Rey         as Flor
   Nathan Miranda   as  Robbie
  Constance Marie as Connie
  Belita Moreno as Bella
  Valente Rodriguez as Val 
  Luis Armand Garcia as Louie
  Rita Moreno as Dolores
  Cheech Marin as Carlos
   Michelle Ortiz  as Mrs. Garcia
  Neil Flynn as Steve
  Eden Sher as June
  Kensie Mills as Paloma
 Harvey Guillen as Miguel 
 Chelsea Rendon as Luna 
 Jessica Marie Garcia as Yesika
 Jacob Vargas as Javier
 Justina Machado as Bunny
 Gregg Sulkin as Dr. Bell
 Jaime Camil
 Constance Wu
   Izzy Diaz
 Camila Cabello
 Brian Austin Green
 Freddie Prinze Jr.
  Schuyler Helford
 Sam Richardson

Episodes

Production

Development
The series is created by George Lopez, his daughter Mayan Lopez, and Debby Wolfe, the latter of whom serves as showrunner. The other executive producers are Bruce Helford, George Lopez, Michael Rotenberg, and Katie Newman. Mayan Lopez is also a producer in the writers' room. On June 14, 2021, the series received a put pilot commitment by NBC. On October 22, 2021, the series was given a pilot order. On April 20, 2022, it was announced that Kelly Park would direct the pilot. On May 11, 2022, the series had been given a series order. On December 2, 2022, NBC
ordered nine additional episodes, bringing up the season to a total of 22 episodes.

Casting
On April 6, 2022, Selenis Leyva, Brice Gonzalez and Matt Shively were cast in main roles for the pilot. Two weeks later, Laci Mosley and Kiran Deol were cast in recurring roles for the pilot.

Release
The series premiered on November 4, 2022 on NBC.

Reception

References

External links
 
 

2020s American sitcoms
2022 American television series debuts
English-language television shows
NBC original programming
Television series about families
Television series by 3 Arts Entertainment
Television series by Universal Television
Latino sitcoms